Elpídio Barbosa Conceição, also known as Dill (born March 4, 1974) is a Brazilian retired footballer who played as a forward.

In a 16-year professional career, he played for several Série A clubs, being the top scorer in 2000, and also competed in four other countries, namely in Portugal.

Early career
Born in São Luís, Maranhão, Dill started his career playing futsal in 1991, defending Santa Cruz-DF of Distrito Federal, moving to Brasília Futebol Clube in 1992.

Football career
Dill was transferred to Goiás Esporte Clube in 1992, playing his first professional game two years later, against Goiatuba Futebol Clube. He was crowned the top goalscorer of the Goiás State Championship in 2000 with 20 goals, netting 10 in the following year's Center-West Cup. He added 20 Série A goals in the 2000 season, tied with Romário and Magno Alves.

Dill played 68 top division games for Goiás and scored 28 goals during his spell. His first abroad adventure was unassuming, as he only scored twice in just nine games for Olympique de Marseille and Servette FC combined.

Dill returned to Brazil in 2002, moving to São Paulo Futebol Clube and leaving the club after playing 14 top level games. After representing Botafogo de Futebol e Regatas for two years, he joined Clube de Regatas do Flamengo in 2004, moving to Esporte Clube Bahia in 2005, and leaving for Brasiliense Futebol Clube shortly after.

Dill spent the following three seasons in Portugal, suffering consecutive top division relegations with F.C. Penafiel and C.D. Aves, then playing in the lower leagues with F.C. Famalicão.

After a few months with FK Sūduva Marijampolė from Lithuania, Dill returned to his country and signed for Santa Cruz Futebol Clube. He moved back to Portugal shortly after, retiring after one season in the third regional division with Futebol Clube da Foz.

Honors

Individual

Goiás State Championship: Top scorer 2000
Center-West Cup: Top scorer 2001

References

External links
 
 Dill at Futpédia 
 

1974 births
Living people
Brazilian footballers
Association football forwards
Campeonato Brasileiro Série A players
Goiás Esporte Clube players
São Paulo FC players
Botafogo de Futebol e Regatas players
CR Flamengo footballers
Esporte Clube Bahia players
Brasiliense Futebol Clube players
Santa Cruz Futebol Clube players
Ligue 1 players
Olympique de Marseille players
Swiss Super League players
Servette FC players
Primeira Liga players
F.C. Penafiel players
C.D. Aves players
F.C. Famalicão players
Brazilian expatriate footballers
Expatriate footballers in France
Expatriate footballers in Switzerland
Expatriate footballers in Portugal
Expatriate footballers in Lithuania
People from São Luís, Maranhão
Sportspeople from Maranhão